Where the Buffalo Roam is a 1980 American comedy movie that sporadically portrays writer Hunter S. Thompson.

Where the Buffalo Roam may also refer to:

 Where the Buffalo Roam (1938 film)
 Where the Buffalo Roam (webcomic)
 Where the Buffalo Roam, a nonfiction book by Anne Matthews
 "Where the Buffalo Roam", an episode of the 1960s anthology TV series The Wednesday Play
 "Where the Buffalo Roam", a 1990 episode of the TV drama Neon Rider
 "Where the Buffalo Roam", a 2013 webisode of the documentary series Wild Kingdom
 "Where the Buffalo Roam", a 2022 episode of the animated sitcom Close Enough

See also
 "Home on the Range", the song that popularized this phrase
 "Where the Buggalo Roam", an episode of the animated TV series Futurama